Irene of Athens (750/756 – 9 August 803), surname Sarantapechaina, was Byzantine empress consort to Emperor Leo IV from 775 to 780, regent during the childhood of their son Constantine VI from 780 until 790, co-ruler from 792 until 797, and finally empress regnant and sole ruler of the Eastern Roman Empire from 797 to 802. A member of the politically prominent Sarantapechos family, she was selected as Leo IV's bride for unknown reasons in 768. Even though her husband was an iconoclast, she harbored iconophile sympathies. During her rule as regent, she called the Second Council of Nicaea in 787, which condemned iconoclasm as heretical and brought an end to the first iconoclast period (730–787). Her public figure was very polarizing during her 5 year reign, as most saw a woman not right to solely rule. Her sole reign made her the first ever empress regnant, ruling in her own right, in Roman and Byzantine imperial history.

She was influential in government policies during her husband's reign. His untimely death caused the throne to actually fall to her, leaving her solely in charge. As Irene's son Constantine reached maturity, he began to move out from under the influence of his mother. In the early 790s, several revolts tried to proclaim him as sole ruler. One of these revolts succeeded, but in 792, Irene was re-established in all imperial powers as co-emperor with Constantine. In 797, Irene organized a conspiracy in which her supporters gouged out her son's eyes, maiming him severely. He was imprisoned and probably died shortly afterwards. With him out of the way, Irene proclaimed herself sole ruler. Pope Leo III—already seeking to break links with the Byzantine East—used Irene's alleged unprecedented status as a female ruler of the Roman Empire to proclaim Charlemagne as Emperor of the Romans on Christmas Day of 800 under the pretext that a woman could not rule and so the throne of the Roman Empire was actually vacant. A revolt in 802 overthrew Irene and exiled her to the island of Lesbos, supplanting her on the throne with Nikephoros I. Irene died in exile less than a year later.

Early life
Irene was born in Athens sometime between 750 and 756. She was a member of the noble Greek Sarantapechos family, which had significant political influence in central mainland Greece. Although she was an orphan, her uncle or cousin Constantine Sarantapechos was a patrician and possibly also a strategos ("military general") of the theme of Hellas at the end of the eighth century. Constantine Sarantapechos's son Theophylact was a spatharios and is mentioned as having been involved in suppressing a revolt in 799.

Empress consort
Irene was brought to Constantinople by Emperor Constantine V on 1 November 769 and was married to his son Leo IV on 3 November. Her coronation took place the following month, on 17 December. It is unclear why she was selected as the bride for the young Leo IV. Especially unusual is that, while Constantine V was a militant iconoclast who was known for persecuting venerators of icons, Irene herself displayed iconophile predilections. This fact, combined with the limited information available about her family, has led some scholars to speculate that Irene may have been selected in a bride-show, in which eligible young women were paraded before the bridegroom until one was finally selected. If this was the case, then she would have been the first imperial bride to be selected in this manner. However, there is no solid evidence to support this hypothesis other than the apparent oddity of Irene's selection as Leo IV's bride.

On 14 January 771, Irene gave birth to a son, the future Constantine VI, who was named after his grandfather, Irene's father-in-law, Constantine V. When Constantine V died in September 775, Leo IV ascended to the throne at the age of twenty-five, and Irene became empress. An unnamed female relative of Irene was married to the Bulgar ruler Telerig in 776. Irene also had a nephew.

Leo IV, though an iconoclast like his father, pursued a policy of moderation towards iconophiles. He removed the penalties on monasteries that had been imposed by his father and began appointing monks as bishops. When Patriarch Nicetas I of Constantinople died in 780, Leo IV appointed Paul of Cyprus, who had iconophile sympathies, as his successor, although he did force him to swear oaths that he would uphold the official iconoclasm. During Lent of 780, however, Leo IV's policies on iconophiles became much harsher. He ordered for a number of prominent courtiers to be arrested, scourged, tonsured, and tortured after they were caught venerating icons.

According to the 11th century historian George Kedrenos, who wrote many centuries after Irene's death, this crackdown on iconophiles began after Leo IV discovered two icons hidden underneath Irene's pillow. Leo IV launched an investigation and discovered the courtiers who had brought the icons. He had them tortured and scolded Irene for violating the law and breaking with her faith. Irene insisted that she had not known the icons were there. After the incident, Leo refused to have marital relations with Irene ever again. Lynda Garland, a historian of the Byzantine Empire, states that this story too closely resembles a different story told about the later empress Theodora, wife of Theophilos, to be historically true. Nonetheless, she maintains that it is possible that Irene may have been trying to fill the palace with supporters of iconophilism, which may have triggered Leo IV's crackdown.

Regent and empress: ruling over empire

Leo IV died on 8 September 780 and Irene became regent for their nine-year-old son Constantine VI. Rumors were circulated claiming that Leo IV had died of a fever after putting on the jeweled crown that had been dedicated by either Maurice (ruled 582–602) or Heraclius (ruled 610–641). Irene herself may have promoted this rumor in an effort to smear her deceased husband's memory.

In October, only six weeks after Leo IV's death, Irene was confronted with a conspiracy led by a group of prominent dignitaries that sought to raise Caesar Nikephoros, a half-brother of Leo IV, to the throne. Irene had Bardas (the former strategos of the Armeniac Theme), Gregory (the logothete of the dromos), and Konstantinos (the count of the excubitors) scourged, tonsured, and banished. She replaced all of them with dignitaries who were loyal to her. She had Nikephoros and his four brothers ordained as priests, a status which disqualified them from ruling, and forced them to serve communion at the Hagia Sophia on Christmas Day 780. On the same day, Irene returned the crown her husband had removed as part of a full imperial procession. Possibly hoping to placate supporters of her husband's family, Irene is reported to have proposed that Leo IV's sister Anthousa should join her as co-regent, but Anthousa is said to have rejected the offer.

From the beginning, Irene seems to have taken more power for herself than was traditionally expected of female regents. Her earliest coins depict both herself and her son Constantine VI on the obverse, listing them as co-rulers rather than as ruler and regent. Furthermore, Irene is shown holding the orb, not Constantine, and only Irene's name is listed on the obverse of the coin, with Constantine VI's name only listed on the reverse, the less important side. Also, in all orders, both oral and written, Irene's name took precedence over her son's name, and she signed her orders in the name of the emperor in her own right and her name took precedence in the oath of allegiance. Apart from that, she did not allow Constantine any voice in public affairs. At the same time, Irene appears to have been well aware that her position as regent was insecure. The last female regent of the Byzantine Empire had been Empress Martina, who had only managed to survive as regent for less than a year before her tongue was cut out and she was exiled to the island of Rhodes. Most people were probably expecting that Irene's reign would come to a similarly swift and bloody end.

As early as 781, Irene began to seek a closer relationship with the Carolingian dynasty and the Papacy in Rome. She negotiated a marriage between her son Constantine and Rotrude, a daughter of Charlemagne by his third wife Hildegard. During this time Charlemagne was at war with the Saxons, and would later become the new king of the Franks. Irene went as far as to send an official to instruct the Frankish princess in Greek; however, Irene herself broke off the engagement in 787, against her son's wishes.

Irene next had to subdue a rebellion led by Elpidius, the strategos of Sicily. Irene sent a fleet, which succeeded in defeating the Sicilians. Elpidius fled to Africa, where he defected to the Abbasid Caliphate. After the success of Constantine V's general, Michael Lachanodrakon, who foiled an Abbasid attack on the eastern frontiers, a huge Abbasid army under Harun al-Rashid invaded Anatolia in summer 782. The strategos of the Bucellarian Theme, Tatzates, defected to the Abbasids, and Irene had to agree to pay an annual tribute of 70,000 or 90,000 dinars to the Abbasids.

Ending iconoclasm

Irene's most notable act was the restoration of the veneration of icons (images of Christ or the saints). Having chosen Tarasios, one of her partisans and her former secretary, as Patriarch of Constantinople in 784, she summoned two church councils. The first of these, held in 786 at Constantinople, was frustrated by the opposition of the iconoclast soldiers. The second, convened at Nicaea in 787, formally revived the veneration of icons and reunited the Eastern church with that of Rome. (See Seventh Ecumenical Council.)

While this greatly improved relations with the Papacy, it did not prevent the outbreak of a war with the Franks, who took over Istria and Benevento in 788. In spite of these reverses, Irene's military efforts met with some success: in 782 her favoured courtier Staurakios subdued the Slavs of the Balkans and laid the foundations of Byzantine expansion and re-Hellenization in the area. Nevertheless, Irene was constantly harried by the Abbasids, and in 782 and 798 had to accept the terms of the respective Caliphs Al-Mahdi and Harun al-Rashid.

Fall and return to throne

As Constantine approached maturity he began to grow restless under the autocratic sway of his mother. Although Constantine VI had reached the age of majority, Irene continued to administer the affairs of state in his place and was autocratess of the Romans. Constantine no longer accepted his secondary status and attempted to free himself by force, but this attempt was met and crushed by the Empress, who demanded that the oath of fidelity should thenceforward be taken in her name alone. Irene also tried to convince the army to legitimize her absolute power over the state. The discontent which this caused swelled into open resistance in 790, and the soldiers, headed by the army of the Armeniacs, formally proclaimed Constantine VI as the sole ruler.

As an attempt to restore order to the state, Constantine, in a hollow semblance of friendship, restored Irene's titles and confirmed her position as ruler on 15 January 792. As a result, the Irene-Constantine duumvirate began. However, the rivalry remained, Irene's faction also returned, with her powerful eunuch minister Staurakios once again at the helm, they began to take revenge on anyone who had opposed them in the past or present. In 797 Irene, by cunning intrigues with the Nobles, officers, bishops and courtiers, organized a conspiracy against Constantine. He was forced to flee to the provinces for aid, but even there participants in the plot threatened him. Seized by his attendants (his mother's allies) on the Asiatic shore of the Bosphorus, Constantine was carried back to the palace at Constantinople and was blinded on 19 August. It is unknown whether he managed to survive this event.

Although it is often asserted that, as monarch, Irene called herself "basileus" (βασιλεύς), 'emperor', rather than "basilissa" (βασίλισσα), 'empress', in fact there are only three instances where it can be proven that she used the title "basileus": two legal documents in which she signed herself as "Emperor of the Romans" and a gold coin of hers found in Sicily bearing the title of "basileus". In relation to the coin, the lettering is of poor quality and the attribution to Irene may be problematic. She used the title "basilissa" in all other documents, coins, and seals.

Carolingian Empire

Irene's unprecedented position as an empress ruling in her own right was emphasized by the coincidental rise of the Carolingian Empire in Western Europe, which rivaled Irene's Byzantium in size and power. Charlemagne invaded Italy early on in his reign, annexing the Lombard kingdom of Italy. He also campaigned against the Saxon tribes in northern Germany for more than thirty years, annexing their territory and compelling them to convert to Christianity, and defeated the Avars in Central Europe. In the Iberian Peninsula, Charlemagne's expedition against al-Andalus led to the creation of a buffer zone between Francia and the Islamic world called the Spanish Marches. Charlemagne also increasingly modelled his rule after that of the Roman emperors by sponsoring enormous construction programs, exemplified by the building of his favourite residence at Aachen (in modern-day Germany), standardizing weights and measures and supporting intellectual and artistic endeavors in the Carolingian renaissance.

Charlemagne was crowned Emperor by Pope Leo III on Christmas Day, 800. The clergy and nobles attending the ceremony proclaimed Charlemagne as "Augustus". In support of Charlemagne's coronation, some argued that the imperial position was actually vacant, deeming a woman unfit to be emperor; however, Charlemagne made no claim to the Eastern Roman Empire. Whether he actually desired a coronation at all, remains controversial – his biographer Einhard related that Charlemagne had been surprised by the Pope – but the Eastern Empire felt its role as the sole Roman Empire threatened and began to emphasize its superiority and its Roman identity. Relations between the two empires remained difficult. Irene is said to have endeavored to bring about a marriage alliance between herself and Charlemagne, but according to Theophanes the Confessor, who alone mentions it, the scheme was frustrated by Aetios, one of her favorites.

Deposition and death
In 802 the patricians conspired against her, deposing her on 31 October, and placing Nikephoros, the minister of finance (logothetēs tou genikou), on the throne. Irene was exiled to Lesbos and forced to support herself by spinning wool. She died the following year, on 9 August.

Legacy
A female relative of Irene, Theophano, was chosen in 807 by Emperor Nikephoros I as the bride of his son and heir Staurakios.

Irene's zeal in restoring the icons and monasteries made Theodore the Studite praise her as a saint. She is commemorated by Byzantine Catholic and Eastern Orthodox Christians on 7 August.

Media
H. Rider Haggard incorporated Irene as a villain in his novel The Wanderer's Necklace.

Notes

References

Primary sources

Modern sources
 
 
 
 Barbe, Dominique (1990). Irène de Byzance: La femme empereur. Paris.
 Rosenwein, Barbara H. (2014). A Short History of the Middle Ages, second ed. University of Toronto Press, 80, 98–99.
 Sir Steven Runciman. "The Empress Irene." Conspectus of History 1.1 (1974): 1–11.

 

 
 Wace, Henry and William Smith (1882). A Dictionary of Christian Biography, Literature, Sects and Doctrines, J. Murray.

External links 

De Imperatoribus Romanis – Constantine VI (780–797 AD) and Irene (797–802 AD)

 
750s births
803 deaths
780s in the Byzantine Empire
790s in the Byzantine Empire
800s in the Byzantine Empire
8th-century Byzantine emperors
9th-century Byzantine emperors
8th-century Byzantine empresses
9th-century Byzantine empresses
8th-century Greek people
9th-century Greek people
8th-century viceregal rulers
Byzantine regents
Isaurian dynasty
Byzantine Iconoclasm
Byzantine Athenians
Augustae
Dethroned monarchs
Mothers of Byzantine emperors
Byzantine Empresses regnant
Empresses consort